Bosnia and Herzegovina has participated at the Youth Olympic Games in every edition since the inaugural 2010 Games and every edition after that.

Medal tables

Medals by Summer Games

Medals by Winter Games

Medals by summer sport

List of medalists

Summer Games

Summer Games medalists as part of Mixed-NOCs Team

Flag bearers

See also
Bosnia and Herzegovina at the Olympics
Bosnia and Herzegovina at the Paralympics

References

External links
Bosnia and Herzegovina Olympic Committee

 
Nations at the Youth Olympic Games
Youth sport in Bosnia and Herzegovina